Der gewaltige Hahnrei is an opera by German composer Berthold Goldschmidt based on Le Cocu Magnifique by Fernand Crommelynck. The opera was premiered 14 February 1932 at the Nationaltheater Mannheim.

Recording
Goldschmidt: Der gewaltige Hahnrei - Helen Lawrence (mezzo-soprano), Claudio Otelli (bass), Robert Worle (tenor), Martin Petzold (tenor), Marita Posselt (soprano), Roberta Alexander (soprano), Michael Kraus (tenor) Deutsches Symphonie-Orchester Berlin, conducted Lothar Zagrosek Recorded: 1992–11, Decca 1994

References

Operas
1931 operas
Operas by Berthold Goldschmidt